Daydreamer is a video game developed by Roland Studios.

Plot
In a distant future where the world has been taken over by aliens and undergoing a civil war, a young girl called Olivia must rescue her brother from the aliens.

Gameplay
Weapons at the players disposal include laser guns and flamethrowers. The player also has pets to assist them in tasks. The player encounters large bosses. The game is a side scroller.

Development
Daydreamer was showcased at the Moscone Center’s GDC Play Area at the 2015 Game Developer Conference. It had an unsuccessful crowdfunding campaign.

Daydreamer has Sprite graphics, of rather high quality for its characters, contrasted by a lot of scrolling check patterns for its pause menu.
It also features an interface designed for a gamepad, to the point where the game only displays Gamepad inputs for menues and tutorial messages even when played only a keyboard on Windows.

Reception

Daydreamer received a score of 68/100 on Metacritic for the PlayStation 4 version of the game, indicating "mixed or average" reviews.

Hardcore Gamer gave the PlayStation 4 version of the game a 3.5/5, praising the art style and how it pays homage to platform games from the 1990s.

References

2015 video games
Cancelled Xbox One games
Indie video games
PlayStation 4 games
Science fiction video games
Side-scrolling video games
Video games developed in the United States
Video games featuring female protagonists
Windows games